The Presidential Townhouse is a U.S. government-owned building located at 716 Jackson Place NW in Washington, D.C., reserved for the exclusive use of former presidents of the United States during visits to the capital. Located across Pennsylvania Avenue from the White House, it adjoins several other government-owned townhouses used for official purposes, including Blair House, often used by visiting heads of state.

Purchased by the government in the late 1950s and used for various purposes, the Presidential Townhouse was established in 1969 by order of President Richard Nixon. The furnishings were very sparse until it was refurbished using private funds during the administration of President George W. Bush (2001–2009).  The five-story building includes two dining rooms, several bedrooms, and space for a Secret Service detail in the basement.

Ongoing maintenance of the townhouse is funded by the Former Presidents Act, which provides for office support and Secret Service protection of former presidents.

The townhouse was constructed in the late 1860s. It was once the home of Supreme Court justice Oliver Wendell Holmes Jr.

In 2021, the Office of the National Cyber Director began using the house.

See also 
 Trowbridge House

References 

Buildings of the United States government in Washington, D.C.
Presidency of the United States
Official residences in the United States
Presidential residences in the United States
Federal architecture in Washington, D.C.